The Arajara mabuya  (Copeoglossum arajara) is a species of skink found in Brazil.

References

Copeoglossum
Reptiles described in 1981
Reptiles of Brazil
Endemic fauna of Brazil
Taxa named by Regina Rebouças-Spieker